Mesophleps tabellata is a moth of the family Gelechiidae. It is found in Karnataka, India.

The wingspan is about 13.5 mm. The forewings are greyish white, with scattered black scales.

References

Moths described in 1913
Mesophleps
Moths of Asia